Werner Lampe (born 30 November 1952) is a retired German swimmer and Olympic medalist. He is the brother of Hans Lampe and father of Oliver Lampe. He participated at the 1972 and 1976 Summer Olympics, winning a silver medal in 4 × 200 m freestyle relay, and a bronze medal in 200 m freestyle in 1972.

Lampe shaved off his hair before the 200 m Olympic race in 1972 to reduce the water drag, and then wore a wig at the award ceremony.

After retiring from competitions Lampe worked as a swimming coach. In 2005, aged 52, he defended a PhD at the University of Hannover on the role of exercise in diabetics and overweight persons.

References

1952 births
Living people
Sportspeople from Hanover
German male swimmers
Olympic swimmers of West Germany
Olympic silver medalists for West Germany
Swimmers at the 1972 Summer Olympics
Swimmers at the 1976 Summer Olympics
Olympic bronze medalists in swimming
German male freestyle swimmers
World Aquatics Championships medalists in swimming
European Aquatics Championships medalists in swimming
Medalists at the 1972 Summer Olympics
Olympic bronze medalists for West Germany
Olympic silver medalists in swimming
20th-century German people
21st-century German people